Mohammed Ismael (Arabic:محمد إسماعيل) (born 12 November 1991) is an Emirati footballer who plays as a right back for Ajman.

Career

Dubai
Mohammed Ismael started his career at Dubai and is a product of the Dubai's youth system. On 26 November 2011, Mohammed Ismael made his professional debut for Dubai against Al Wahda in the Pro League, replacing Hassan Mohammed.

Shabab Al-Ahli
He was playing with Dubai and after merging Al Ahli, Al-Shabab and Dubai clubs under the name Shabab Al-Ahli Club he was joined to Shabab Al-Ali. On 21 January 2018, Mohammed Ismael made his professional debut for Shabab Al-Ahli against Ajman in the Pro League.

Ajman
On 11 August 2020, he left Shabab Al-Ali and signed with Ajman.

External links

References

1991 births
Living people
Emirati footballers
Dubai CSC players
Shabab Al-Ahli Club players
Ajman Club players
UAE Pro League players
UAE First Division League players
Association football fullbacks
Place of birth missing (living people)